Ma Shitu (born 14 January 1915) is a Chinese retired politician and novelist. He was president of Sichuan Writers Association.

Biography
Ma was born in Shibao Township, Zhong County, Sichuan, on January 14, 1915. In July 1936, he entered National Central University, where he majored in the Department of Chemical Engineering. During school days, he joined the underground party organization of the Communist Party of China. In March 1938 he joined the Communist Party of China. He founded the Public Newspaper with Hu Sheng in Hankou, Hubei. In 1939 he was appointed party secretary of Western Hubei District. Because the party organization was destroyed by the Kuomintang, he fled to Chongqing in 1941 and then was accepted to National Southwestern Associated University. In 1946 he became party secretary of Chuankang District.

After founding of the Communist State in 1949, he served successively as deputy director of the Organization Department of the CPC Western Sichuan District Committee, director of the Construction Department of Sichuan, director of the Construction Commission, secretary of the party group of the Southwest Branch of the Chinese Academy of Sciences, deputy director of the Publicity Department of the Southwest Bureau of the CPC Central Committee, and deputy director of the Science and Technology Commission. He joined the China Writers Association in 1962. In 1972, he was deputy head of the Propaganda Department of CPC Sichuan Provincial Committee, and served until 1978, when he was appointed vice president of the Chengdu Branch of the Chinese Academy of Sciences and its party branch secretary. On July 5, 2020, in Chengdu, Sichuan, Ma announced that he would no longer write.

He was a delegate to the 6th and 7th National People's Congress.

Personal life
Ma was twice married. His first wife was killed by the Kuomintang.

Works

Adaptations  
His fiction, Stealing Official Position, was made into a phenomenally successful film by Jiang Wen in 2010.

References

1915 births
Living people
People from Zhong County
National Southwestern Associated University alumni
Writers from Sichuan
Chinese novelists
Delegates to the 6th National People's Congress
Delegates to the 7th National People's Congress
Chinese centenarians
Men centenarians